Binary form may refer to:
 In music, binary form is a form (structure) consisting of two related parts.
 In computer science and mathematics, number in the binary form refers to the use of binary numeral system.
 In mathematics, a binary form is a homogeneous polynomial in two variables.
 The article binary quadratic form discusses binary forms of degree two.
 The article invariant of a binary form discusses binary forms of higher degree.
 Binary form is another name for a binary quantic